John C. Goodman (born 22 May 1946) is president and CEO of the Goodman institute for Public Policy  Research, a think tank focused on public policy issues. He was the founding chief executive of the National Center for Policy Analysis, which operated from 1982 to 2017. He is a senior fellow at the Independent Institute. The Wall Street Journal and The National Journal have called Goodman the "father of Health Savings Accounts."

Goodman received a Ph.D. in economics from Columbia University in 1977 and has taught and done research at Columbia, Stanford, Dartmouth, Southern Methodist University, and the University of Dallas.

In 1983, he founded the National Center for Policy Analysis (NCPA), a think tank that was the source of such policy ideas as Health Savings Accounts, Roth IRAs, automatic employer enrollment in 401(k) plans and allowing seniors to continue working without penalty after they begin receiving Social Security benefits.

In his 2012 book Priceless: Curing the Healthcare Crisis, Goodman asserts that empowering both patients and caregivers to control healthcare decisions produces greater patient satisfaction at substantially lower costs. The book emphasizes the importance that patients, payers, and providers each operate according to economic incentives that encourage them consider both the costs and benefits of care, innovate to improve outcomes and lower costs, and provide subsidies that do not arbitrarily benefit one group (like workers at companies that provide insurance) at the expense of other groups (like workers at companies that do not).

He regularly briefs members of Congress on economic policy and testifies before congressional committees. He is author and co-author of 15 books and more than 50 published studies on such topics as health policy, tax reform and school choice. He has addressed more than 100 different organizations on public policy issues.

He writes a column for Forbes and an occasional weekend column for Townhall. He has appeared 23 times on C-Span.

Early history 

Born on May 22, 1946, Goodman grew up in Waco, Texas. In high school, he won several statewide tournaments. This experience served him later in life when he became a TV debating partner of conservative polemicist William F. Buckley.

He attended college at the University of Texas in Austin, where he became involved in campus politics and was elected vice president of the student body. The following year he lost the race for president to Lloyd Doggett, who later served as a senior Democratic member of the House of Representatives. University of Texas student politics was a training ground for such politicians as Texas governors Allan Shivers and John Connally.

After college, Goodman enrolled in the graduate economics program at Columbia University, where he earned a PhD. He credits his experience with campus politics as vital to shaping his Columbia University dissertation—which used tools of economics to explain political outcomes. Among the faculty who gave him guidance were three Nobel Prize winners – Robert Mundell, Edmund Phelps and William Vickrey.

Goodman's impossibility theorem 
Goodman's dissertation was entitled The Market for Coercion: A Neoclassical Theory of the State. It was in the field of public choice, which merges economics and political science. As the term "neoclassical" suggests, the dissertation used marginal analysis—which was a radical departure from the voting models favored by public choice theorists James Buchanan and Gordon Tullock and their followers, on the one hand, and University of Chicago economist George Stigler's "regulatory capture" theory, on the other.

With his colleague Phil Porter, Goodman published three articles extending the theory to the fields of regulation, the production of public goods, and welfare economics. Their article on regulation won the prestigious Duncan Black Prize awarded by the Public Choice Society in 1989.

An important issue in public choice economics is whether a stable equilibrium exists. In traditional voting models it typically does not. Yet Goodman showed that in a neoclassical model the conditions for stable equilibrium are easy to satisfy.

Three other departures from previous thinking were also important.

Groups, not individuals, as the unit of account 
Every law and every regulation tends to have winners and losers. Both groups have a self-interest in either supporting or opposing the change. However, the passage of a law is a "public good" for those who support it and a "public bad" for those who oppose it. In either case, individuals benefit from their group's success, whether or not they contribute to the effort.

A well-known proposition in public finance holds that if all behavior is voluntary, public goods will tend to be underproduced. In politics, this means that the effort groups make to secure political goals will always understate the true value they place on achieving those goals. The reason is that each individual has an incentive to be a free rider, contributing little or no effort while hoping that others will contribute a lot.

The groups that are most successful in overcoming the free rider problems and securing more effort from their members are the groups that are the most successful in the political system.

Note: an individual may be member of several different groups, including groups that oppose each other. For example, an auto worker might pay dues to a union that supports higher tariffs on car imports. But as a buyer of cars, he may pay dues to an auto club that opposes them. In his role as a producer he is a member of a pro-tariff group. In his role as a consumer, he is a member of an anti-tariff group. What matters most is the behavior of groups as groups, not the behavior of individual members.

Political equilibrium 
Imagine a political system in which the laws change every week. One week we might have a tariff on auto imports; the next week it's gone; the week after that it's back again. That would describe a system with no political equilibrium. By contrast, equilibrium exists if the tariff tends to stay the same from week to week until there is a fundamental change in one of the parameters of the system.

Goodman not only showed that the neoclassical approach realistically models stable political systems, he also identified what an equilibrium must look like. Continuing with the tariff example, the marginal effort the proponents are willing to make to secure a small increase in the tariff must equal the marginal effort the opponents are willing to make to oppose it. These efforts could be in the form of votes, campaign contributions, etc., and the kind of effort that is possible will differ from system to system. Any deviation from this condition means that the decision maker risks being replaced by a rival, who can gain an advantage by supporting the set of equilibrium policies over the deviation.

Political prices 
The third innovation was to decompose the equilibrium condition. The marginal effort that producers are willing to make to secure a slightly higher tariff is the marginal economic benefit they expect multiplied times the effort they are willing to make per dollar of benefit. On the other side, the marginal effort consumers are willing to make to oppose the change is the marginal economic cost they expect to avoid multiplied times their effort per dollar of benefit. These effort-benefit ratios are the "political prices" proponents and opponents of the change are willing to "pay."

Social welfare economics teaches that public policies are optimal when marginal social benefit equals marginal social cost. But that can only happen if the political prices are the same on either side of every political issue. Ordinarily we would expect people to spend a dollar to get a dollar. But for reasons given above, people will understate the value they place on policy changes and in the general case they will understate it a lot.

Because of differences in organization costs, information costs, and many other factors, we would never expect the effort-benefit ratios of two opposing groups to be the same. Furthermore, Goodman and Porter discovered that small differences in political prices lead to large welfare losses for society as a whole—much larger, for example, than what we would ordinarily expect to find in the private sector. That leads to:

Goodman’s Theorem: Since the conditions for optimality will almost never hold in any political system, optimal government is in principle impossible.

If the political price milk producers are willing to pay is greater than the political price offered by the consumers of milk, we will get milk price supports. If the price sugar growers are willing to pay is higher than the one offered by sugar consumers, we will get sugar quotas. We get bad government, or "government failure," not because of bad leaders. We get bad government because of inequality in the political prices opposing groups are willing to pay to obtain benefits and avoid costs in the political system.

Health economics 

Goodman's interest in health economics began with his study of the British National Health Service. It was the first time anyone had used public choice theory to explain all the major features of British medicine. He followed with a study of the 150-year history of the suppression of markets in health care at the urging of the American Medical Association. Regulation of who could practice medicine, regulation of medical schools, regulation of hospitals and regulation of health insurance all followed the AMA agenda, according to the study.
In 1992, Goodman wrote Patient Power with Gerald Musgrave. The book shaped right-of-center thinking on health policy—from Newt Gingrich to Paul Ryan—for many years. Its thesis: patients should be empowered in the medical marketplace the way consumers are empowered in other markets. This ran counter to the thinking in virtually all health policy circles, however. The dominant view at the time was adherence to managed care, under which decisions are made by experts, typically following formal practice guidelines.

In Priceless (2013), Goodman's approach to health economics was even more radical. He portrayed the health care system as a complex system that cannot be understood with conventional economic tools such as supply and demand curves. In doing so, he rejected the approach of every major health economics textbook on the market. Even so, the book won praise from people in and out of government and across the political spectrum—including Peter Orszag, who was chief economist for President Barack Obama at the time.

Health Savings Accounts 
Goodman's most important policy success has been the adoption of Health Savings Accounts (HSAs). They allow people to manage some of their own health care dollars in tax-free accounts. The idea was first introduced to the public policy community in Patient Power, but HSAs were initially opposed by every major health and business lobby. For that reason, they did not become available to most Americans until 12 years later—in 2004. As of 2016, 40 million American families had HSAs. A majority of large employers now offer high-deductible health plans, with savings accounts attached, to their employees and these types of plans are the fastest growing product in the health insurance marketplace.

The RAND Corporation says HSA plans can cut the cost of health insurance by up to 30%, with no adverse health effects—even for the most vulnerable populations. More than half of all private health plans in South Africa are Medical Savings Account plans. Singapore has an extensive system of "medisave" accounts. There are also health savings accounts in China.

Under current tax law, employer deposits to HSAs are treated the same as employer payment of health insurance premiums—they are excluded from the employee's taxable income. However, under Obamacare people receive fixed-sum tax credits to buy their insurance and most Republican Obamacare replacement plans also use tax credits.
In an article in Health Affairs, Goodman and Wharton health economist Mark Pauly argued that the right way to subsidize health insurance for everyone is with a tax credit. Further, they showed that a Roth HSA, with after-tax deposits and tax free withdraws, is the right account to combine with the credit.

Today's tax law places rigid restrictions on how HSAs can be used. For example, there must be an across-the-board deductible, covering all medical expenses. However, Goodman now argues that accounts should have no deductibles or copayments. For example, employees could be given an account from which to manage all primary care. Diabetics and patients with other chronic conditions could manage their own budgets along with incentives to manage their own care.

Repealing one law, blocking another 
In 1989, a series of NCPA studies of taxes on the elderly led to the repeal of the Medicare Catastrophic Coverage Act, an attempt to extend drug coverage to Medicare beneficiaries. This was the first repeal of a major federal welfare program in more than 100 years. Nobel Laureate Milton Friedman, the editors of The Wall Street Journal and many others credited Goodman and his coauthors with the change, citing NCPA studies and its communications efforts as the primary reasons for the policy reversal.

In 1994, Hillary Clinton failed in a major effort to reform the health care system. In his book Whitewash: What the Media Won’t Tell You About Hillary Clinton, Brent Bozell says that Goodman was one of three people who were most responsible for the defeat of Hillary Care. (The other two were Sen. Phil Gramm and commentator Bill Kristol.)

Reforming the health care system 
Health reform has been an enduring interest for Goodman. In Characteristics of an Ideal Health Care System, he identified ten ways in which government policies were creating the very problems many reformers want to solve. In Designing Ideal Health Insurance, he showed how public policies were preventing the insurance market from meeting people's needs. In the Journal of Legal Medicine, he argued for a do-no-harm approach—under which government policies that are causing problems would be repealed and replaced before any other reforms are considered.

One of Goodman's reform ideas is to replace all the ways government currently subsidizes health insurance through tax and spending programs with a universal, refundable tax credit—essentially giving every citizen a fixed number of dollars for health insurance. That idea was elaborated with Mark Pauly in Health Affairs and it became the core health insurance plan endorsed by John McCain in his presidential run against Barack Obama in 2008. The legislative version of the McCain approach was introduced by Tom Coburn and Richard Burr in the Senate and Paul Ryan and Devon Nunes in the House of Representatives.

Reforming Obamacare 
In an article at the Health Affairs Blog, Goodman argued that there were six major problems in the Affordable Care Act that will not go away without major reform. For example, the first problem is that people are being required to buy a health plan whose cost is expected to grow at twice the rate of growth of their income. These ideas were expanded into A Better Choice, a monograph published by the Independent Institute.

Beginning in 2015, Goodman helped House Rules Committee Chairman Pete Sessions (R-TX) and Sen. Bill Cassidy (R-LA) develop a replacement plan for Obamacare. The plan calls for a universal tax credit for health insurance, personal and portable health insurance for employees and a flexible Roth HSA. In a post at the Health Affairs Blog, Sessions, Cassidy and Goodman argue that their plan is not only better than Obamacare, it would create universal coverage.

Other public policy achievements 
With the help of Madsen Pirie and Eamonn Butler at the Adam Smith Institute in London, Goodman introduced Margaret Thatcher's 22 techniques of privatization into the United States, leading to increases in privatization at the state and local level. The effort was helped by the publication of two NCPA books: Madsen Pirie's Dismantling the State: The Theory And Practice of Privatization and John Goodman's Privatization.

He organized the first report card on public schools in the United States—ranking them based on the performance of students on standardized tests. In response, NCPA board member Pat Rooney started the first private voucher program, leading to many similar efforts across the country.

With Richard Rahn, chief economist for the US Chamber of Commerce, Goodman produced five pro-growth tax ideas that became the tax policy core of the 1994 Contract with America. These ideas included the Roth IRA and allowing seniors to keep working beyond the retirement age without losing their Social Security benefits—ideas that later became law.

With Peter Orszag (then at the Brookings Institution), Goodman helped reform the 401(k) law so that employers can now automatically enroll their employees in plans with diversified portfolios.

Other public policy ideas 
Goodman's other contributions to public policy include:
 His essay on "Classical Liberalism" has become viral on the Internet, providing a one-of-its-kind explanation of the political philosophy that dominated the 19th Century.
 His proposal for a "progressive flat tax" in Forbes represents a novel way of bringing the right and left together on tax reform.
 His proposal for radical reform of the US banking system (with Laurence Kotlikoff) in the New Republic called for 100% reserves for all credit market institutions as a way of preventing future financial crises.
 His proposal to let people allocate their own welfare tax dollars has had a lot of appeal in conservative circles. In a version of the idea, 17 states now allow a dollar-for-dollar reduction in taxes for contributions to private schools and charter schools.
 His case for school choice, presented in a classic debate at Howard University, was published in the Howard Law Review.
 His work with Thomas Saving and Andrew Rettenmaier (Texas A & M) has produced a proposal for privatizing Medicare, similar to previous proposals for privatizing Social Security.
 His "enterprise program" proposal to allow businesses that provide essential services to low-income customers to avoid many government regulations—including occupational licensing—has proved appealing, both to the right and the left.
 His proposal to replace medical malpractice law with no-fault compensation has been proposed in Georgia and Florida.

Television debates 
Goodman appeared about two dozen times as a guest on William F. Buckley's PBS Firing Line program in the 1990s. About a half dozen of these were two-hour debates that pitted Goodman, Buckley and two colleagues against four opponents. They covered such topics as the flat tax, school vouchers, Social Security privatization, Health Savings Accounts and privatizing the welfare state. This was the first time these ideas had ever been aired on national television.

Buckley and Goodman were joined by such debating partners as former Delaware Governor Pete du Pont, former Treasury Secretary Pete Peterson, Senator Phil Gramm, economist Thomas Sowell and California Governor Jerry Brown (arguing for the flat tax). The opposing sides included former presidential candidate George McGovern, Senator Jay Rockefeller, MIT economist Lester Thurow, Nobel Laurate Kenneth Arrow and TV commentator Susan Estrich.

Firing Line's producer, Warren Steibel, later produced another TV program called Debates/Debates. Goodman served as team captain on many of those programs.

Publications
 The Regulation of Medical Care: Is the Price Too High? (Cato public policy research monograph)  (1980)
 National Health Care in Great Britain  (1980) 
 Social Security in the United Kingdom: Contracting Out of the System (Aei Studies, 335) (1981) 
 Economics of Public Policy: The Micro View, with Edwin G. Dolan (1985)
 Privatization. (1985) National Center for Policy Analysis. 
 Fighting the War of Ideas in Latin America, with Ramona Marotz-Baden (1990) 
 Patient Power: Solving America's Health Care Crisis (1992) 
 Patient Power: The Free-Enterprise Alternative to Clinton's Health Plan, with Gerald L. Musgrave (1993) 
 Economics of Public Policy, with Edwin G. Dolan (1995) 
  Lives at Risk: Single-Payer National Health Insurance Around the World, with Gerald L. Musgrave, Devon M. Herrick and Milton Friedman (2004) 
 
 ·Leaving Women Behind: Modern Families, Outdated Laws. (2005) With Kimberley Strassel and Celeste Cogan. Rowman & Littlefield 
 ·Handbook on State Health Reform. (2007) National Center for Policy Analysis 
 
 ·Living with ObamaCare: A Consumer’s Guide.  (2014) National Center for Policy Analysis. 
 A Better Choice: Healthcare Solutions for America Independent Institute  (2015)

References

External links
 

Living people
American libertarians
American political writers
American male non-fiction writers
Health economists
1946 births